Kurt Zellers (born October 16, 1969) is an American politician who served as speaker of the Minnesota House of Representatives from 2011 to 2013 and minority leader from 2009 to 2011. A member of the Republican Party of Minnesota, he represented the 34B district in Hennepin County. He was a candidate in the 2014 Minnesota gubernatorial election, losing in the Republican primary.

Early life, education, and career
Zellers was born in Grand Forks, North Dakota and raised on a farm near Devils Lake, graduating from Devils Lake Central High School in 1988. He received a Bachelor of Science degree in political science from the University of North Dakota, where he was a member of the North Dakota Fighting Hawks football team.

Career 
He worked as communications director for U.S. Senator Rod Grams from 1994 to 2000, and as communications director for the Minnesota House Republican Caucus from 2000 to 2003 before being elected to the House himself. After his election, he took a position as a senior account executive with a Minneapolis public relations firm.

Minnesota House of Representatives 
Zellers was first elected in a special election on February 25, 2003. The seat had become vacant when Representative Rich Stanek resigned after being appointed Minnesota's Commissioner of Public Safety by Governor Tim Pawlenty. Zellers has been reelected in every election since then.

Zellers became an assistant majority leader in 2003 and, after House control was won by the Minnesota Democratic–Farmer–Labor Party (DFL) in the 2006 elections, continued as an assistant minority leader. During the 2009 to 2010 legislative biennium, he was a member of the House Commerce and Labor Committee and the Taxes Committee. He also served on the Commerce and Labor Subcommittee for the Labor and Consumer Protection Division, and on the Finance Subcommittee for the Transportation and Transit Policy and Oversight Division.

On June 23, 2009, Zellers was elected by the House Republican Caucus to succeed Representative Marty Seifert as Minority Leader. Seifert had stepped down to focus on a potential campaign for governor. On November 6, 2010, Zellers was selected by his caucus to serve as Speaker of the Minnesota House of Representatives for the 2011 to 2012 legislative session.

On February 24, 2014, Zellers announced that he would not seek reelection to the House, in order to concentrate on his gubernatorial campaign.
He was succeeded by Dennis Smith on January 6, 2015.

2014 Minnesota gubernatorial campaign 

On June 23, 2013, Zellers announced his candidacy in the 2014 Minnesota gubernatorial election. He was defeated in the Republican primary on August 12, 2014, by the party's endorsed candidate, Jeff Johnson.

References

External links

 Rep. Kurt Zellers official Minnesota House of Representatives website
 Kurt Zellers official gubernatorial campaign website
 Minnesota Public Radio Votetracker: Rep. Kurt Zellers
 Project Vote Smart - Rep. Kurt Zellers Profile

|-

1969 births
Living people
People from Devils Lake, North Dakota
People from Maple Grove, Minnesota
American people of German descent
Speakers of the Minnesota House of Representatives
Republican Party members of the Minnesota House of Representatives
American Lutherans
University of North Dakota alumni
21st-century American politicians